George Jacob FRCGS, is the President  & CEO of Bay Ecotarium/Bay.Org in San Francisco, where he oversees a staff of 200 at its seven institutions including the Smithsonian Affiliated  Aquarium of the Bay, The Bay Institute, the Sea Lion Center, the Eco Center at Heron's Head Park, the Bay Model Alliance, EcoXpeditions and the Bay Academy.

Work
Trained at the Smithsonian, educated at the Birla Institute of Technology & Science, University of Toronto, Getty Leadership Institute at Claremont Graduate University and Yale School of Management, Jacob has led over 100 museum and exhibit design-build projects, including nature and wetland parks, wildlife, art and science center assignments in various countries, and is the Founding Director of four museums in his career including the Nasa Ames funded a Mauna Kea Astronomy Education Center (now Imiloa) in Hawaii. In 2015 he delivered the fastest museum design-build project as the founding President and CEO of the Philip J. Currie Dinosaur Museum in northern Alberta winning 9 awards in 9 months.  A Canadian Commonwealth Scholar, Jacob developed the first Masters Studio on Museum Design at the Faculty of Architecture, University of Manitoba, and the first Executive Program on Cultural Leadership and Diplomacy at the University of Texas. He has published over 150 opinion columns, interviews and newspaper editorials on interpretive planning, museum design, professional development, civic reach, sustainability, public art, exhibit design, master planning and advocacy. Jacob is the author of 10 books on the future of Museum Design and Practice. He was the Project Director for the Smithsonian's 1812 Star-Spangled Banner permanent exhibit production, re-opened in 2008 by President George W. Bush. He is a Fellow of the Royal Canadian Geographical Society. 

Named as the 50 most influential by the Alberta Venture magazine in 2016, he has been featured in Forbes, Azure, Air Canada Enroute, Air India, Singapore Straits Times, Toronto Star, Globe & Mail, The Economist, Times of India, Indian Express, Art & Architecture, Hawaii Tribune, San Francisco Chronicle, San Francisco Examiner, Odessa American, Midland Daily News and Mercedes Benz magazine, among many others.  

In 2018 he unveiled his vision for a $260 million world’s first Climate Resilience and Ocean Conservation Living Museum in San Francisco - the Bay Ecotarium - with Dr. Jill Biden delivering the Key Note. Appointed Chief Advisor to United Nations Environment Program for Climate initiatives in the Caribbean, he leads similar projects in Norway, Jamaica and Scotland. 

He serves on the Board of Directors of California Travel Association, International Council of Museums (ICOM USA) and ICOM-ICTOP (International Committee on Training of Museum Professionals).. In 2022 he was elected on the Board of Directors of the United States Travel Association.

Awards
 2014 Alberta Construction Award (Philip J. Currie Dinosaur Museum)
 2015 Prairie Wood Works Awards (3): Engineering/ Architectural Design/Innovation (Philip J. Currie Dinosaur Museum)
 2016 Outstanding Achievement (Science): Canadian Museums Association
 2016 Leadership Innovation Award: Canadian Association of Science Centres
 2016 International Wood Design Award (Structural Engineering) (Philip J. Currie Dinosaur Museum)
 2018 Secretary’s Award on Environmental Sustainability for Eco Center Park at Herons Head, California Museums Association
 2019 Louie Kamookak Medal, Royal Canadian Geographical Society
 2020 California Travel Association Sustainability Advocacy Award
 2021 Global Future Design Award for Concept Design of BayEcotarium - Climate and Ocean living museum.
 2022 Global Future Design Silver Award for Future Architecture (Concept) of BayEcotarium - Climate and Ocean living museum. 
 2022 Late Queen Elizabeth II Platinum Jubilee Medal, Canada.

References 

Year of birth missing (living people)
Living people
American businesspeople
People from San Francisco